Mai Aih Naing (born 18 October 1990 in Taungoo, Burma) is Burmese footballer. He plays for club Okktha United in Myanmar National League as a striker. He was called to Myanmar national football team at the 2010 AFF Suzuki Cup and 2014 FIFA World Cup qualifiers.

International goals

U23

Myanmar

References

External links 
 
 Goal.com profile

1990 births
Living people
Burmese footballers
Myanmar international footballers
Kanbawza F.C. players
People from Bago Region
Association football forwards
Southeast Asian Games bronze medalists for Myanmar
Southeast Asian Games medalists in football
Competitors at the 2011 Southeast Asian Games